Brails, in a sailing ship, are small lines used to haul in or up the edges (leeches) or corners of sails, before furling. On a ship rig, these brails are most often found on the mizzen sail. The command is, hale up the brails, or, brail up the sails. The word brail comes from Middle English brayle, from Anglo-French braiel belt, strap, brail, alteration of Old French braiuel belt, probably ultimately from Latin braca pant.

A brail net is a type of net incorporating brail lines on a small fishing net on a boat or castnet.

A brail net used for casting is also referred to as an English net as opposed to a Spanish net.

See also
Clewlines and buntlines
Reefing
Guy (sailing)

References

Nautical terminology
Sailing rigs and rigging
Sailboat components
Ropework